Yolimar Elizabeth Pineda Medina (born November 14, 1985) is a Venezuelan long-distance runner. She competed in the marathon at the 2012 and 2016 Olympics and finished 94th and 93rd, respectively.

International competitions

References

1985 births
Living people
Sportspeople from Valencia, Venezuela
Venezuelan female marathon runners
Venezuelan female long-distance runners
Olympic athletes of Venezuela
Athletes (track and field) at the 2012 Summer Olympics
Athletes (track and field) at the 2016 Summer Olympics
Pan American Games competitors for Venezuela
Athletes (track and field) at the 2011 Pan American Games
Venezuelan female cross country runners
20th-century Venezuelan women
21st-century Venezuelan women